Ganeriidae is a family of echinoderms belonging to the order Valvatida.

Genera
Genera:
 Aleutiaster Clark, 1939
 Cuenotaster Thiéry, 1920
 Cycethra Bell, 1881
 Ganeria Gray, 1847
 Hyalinothrix Fisher, 1911
 Knightaster Clark, 1972
 Perknaster Sladen, 1889
 Scotiaster Koehler, 1907
 Tarachaster Fisher, 1913
 Vemaster Bernasconi, 1965

References

Valvatida